Raymond Anthony "A. J." McCarron Jr. (born September 13, 1990) is an American football quarterback for the St. Louis BattleHawks of the XFL. He previously played in the National Football League (NFL) for eight seasons. McCarron played college football at Alabama, where he became the first quarterback to win consecutive BCS National Championship Games with victories in 2012 and 2013. He also received the Maxwell, Johnny Unitas Golden Arm, and Kellen Moore Awards.

McCarron was selected by the Cincinnati Bengals in the fifth round of the 2014 NFL Draft and played four seasons as a backup. He spent his next four seasons as a backup with the Oakland Raiders, Houston Texans, and Atlanta Falcons. Following the 2021 NFL season, McCarron joined the XFL.

Early years
McCarron was born to Dee Dee Bonner and Tony McCarron on September 13, 1990. He also has a younger brother named Corey McCarron who formerly played tight end at Alabama but transferred to play fullback at Middle Tennessee State.

McCarron was born and raised in Mobile, Alabama. He attended Our Lady of Lourdes Catholic School from kindergarten to fourth grade before transferring to St. Paul's Episcopal School. At the age of five, McCarron was severely injured in a jet-ski accident and almost died. He first played football at Trimmier Park and then Langan Park in Mobile. He played on the same park team as future college teammate Mark Barron. During McCarron's junior season of high school, St. Paul's went 14–1 and went on to win the state championship against Briarwood Christian School off a missed PAT. While attending St. Paul's, McCarron was recruited by several football programs in the Southeastern Conference, including Alabama, Auburn, Mississippi, and Tennessee. He committed to the Crimson Tide on May 3, 2008, becoming the only quarterback signed by Alabama for their 2009 recruiting class.

He capped off his high school football career at the 2009 U.S. Army All-American Bowl.

College career

2010 season
In his first season at Alabama, McCarron accepted a redshirt and did not play during the season as the team went 14–0 to capture the 2009 National Championship over the Texas Longhorns. During his redshirt freshman year, he did see some playing time, appearing in nine games as the Crimson Tide finished 10–3. His first collegiate touchdown pass came during the season opener when he connected with wide receiver Julio Jones on a 29-yard pass against San Jose State. He passed for a total of 389 yards and three touchdowns during the season. Against Auburn on Alabama's last possession McCarron came in for injured starter Greg McElroy. However, McCarron threw four straight incompletions to end the game as Auburn came back to win 28–27 after being down 24–0 in the second quarter.

2011 season
After a tight competition for the starting quarterback position during spring practices, McCarron was named as the co-starting quarterback alongside Phillip Sims for the team's 2011 season opener versus Kent State, and later became the de facto starter by starting in every game. In his first collegiate start, he passed for 226 yards and one touchdown with two interceptions as Alabama won 48–7. His first road start for Alabama came the following week, as the Tide traveled to State College, Pennsylvania. His performance of 163 yards with no turnovers helped Alabama defeat Penn State by a score of 27–11, which came to be the last loss for head coach Joe Paterno. Another solid performance, alongside running back Trent Richardson, helped him get a victory in his first SEC start, a 38–14 win versus #14 Arkansas.

During the course of his sophomore season, McCarron helped lead the Crimson Tide to a 11–1 overall record during the regular season, including 7–1 record in conference. Alabama's only loss of the season came during a 6–9 overtime defeat at the hands of #1-ranked LSU. During the game, he completed 16-of-28 passes for 199 yards with one interception. By remaining unbeaten during the rest of the regular season, Alabama again met LSU at the Superdome for the national championship. His performance of 234 yards passing earned him Offensive Player of the Game in a 21–0 rout of the Tigers. During his first season as starting quarterback, he passed for a total of 2,634 yards with 16 touchdowns and five interceptions and a BCS National Championship.

2012 season

McCarron had a strong start in his second year as starting quarterback for Alabama as the Crimson Tide started off the season with a 9–0 record. His good start to the season, including a comeback victory over LSU, had several media members put him as a dark horse candidate for the year's Heisman Trophy. His first interception, and Alabama's first loss, of the season came in the team's 10th game of the season.

In their first year in the SEC, Texas A&M and eventual Heisman-winner Johnny Manziel came into Bryant–Denny Stadium and upset Alabama 29–24. McCarron's second interception of the game seemingly sealed Alabama's loss, as he threw an interception on a fourth & goal pass with under two minutes remaining. Both he and Alabama rebounded to remain unbeaten during the rest of the regular season, which led them to the 2012 SEC Championship Game versus Georgia. With the help of running back Eddie Lacy, Alabama battled the Bulldogs to win 32–28 and earn a shot to play for the 2013 BCS National Championship against No. 1 Notre Dame.

On December 12, 2012, ahead of their game versus Notre Dame, McCarron announced that he would be coming back to Alabama for his senior season. On January 7, 2013, Alabama met Notre Dame for the 2013 BCS National Championship. The Fighting Irish were led by their defense and Heisman runner-up Manti Te'o to an unbeaten 12–0 regular season record. However, their defense was overmatched as Alabama rolled 42–14 to capture their third BCS National Championship in four years behind McCarron's 264 yards and four touchdown passes, which allowed him to become the first quarterback to win back-to-back BCS titles. During his junior season, he threw for a school-record 30 touchdown passes in a season, as well as 49 touchdown passes over his career. He was named winner of the 2012 CFPA Quarterback Trophy on January 22, 2013.

2013 season

McCarron made the cover of Sports Illustrated October 30, 2013, edition, which asked whether he was one of the best college players ever. At that time, McCarron (whose team was 10–0) was a long shot for the Heisman Trophy.

As a senior in 2013, McCarron was again a second-team All-Southeastern Conference (SEC) selection. During the season, he passed John Parker Wilson to become Alabama's all time passing yard leader. Alabama started the season with an 11–0 record before facing Auburn in the Iron Bowl. In the 34–28 loss, he finished with 277 passing yards and three touchdowns, one of which was a 99-yard pass to Amari Cooper. The loss knocked Alabama out of contention for the SEC Championship. The Crimson Tide finished their season in the Sugar Bowl against Oklahoma. In the 45–31 loss to the Sooners, he had 387 passing yards, two touchdowns, and two interceptions in his final collegiate game. He also broke Greg McElroy's record for passing yards in a season, with 3,063. He finished in second place in the Heisman Trophy voting that season.

Career statistics

Professional career
Coming out of Alabama, McCarron was projected by the majority of NFL draft experts and scouts to be drafted in the second or third round. He was praised for his game management and decision making, with the potential to become an NFL starter. 

McCarron was drafted by the Cincinnati Bengals in the fifth round of the 2014 NFL Draft with the 164th overall pick. Surprisingly, along with University of Georgia quarterback Aaron Murray, McCarron's draft value drastically dropped during the draft, as he was the ninth quarterback selected, out of the total 14. It was reported that teams felt during pre-draft interviews that he came across cocky and over-confident. When asked what his best attribute was during an interview at the combine, McCarron responded, "Winning!"

Cincinnati Bengals

2014 season: Rookie year
On May 22, 2014, the Bengals signed him to a four-year, $2.4 million contract with a $181,652 signing bonus. In August 2014, the Bengals placed him on the reserve/non-football injury list due to shoulder soreness, meaning that he would miss at least the first six weeks of the 2014 season. With Andy Dalton entrenched as the starting quarterback for the Bengals, and veteran Jason Campbell as his backup, the Bengals did not plan for McCarron to see significant playing time during his rookie season. On December 9, 2014, McCarron was activated after linebacker Vontaze Burfict was placed on injured reserve.

2015 season
McCarron was named the backup quarterback to begin the season after beating out Keith Wenning and Terrelle Pryor during training camp.

During a 31–10 victory in Week 9, McCarron appeared in his first career game against the Cleveland Browns. Three weeks later, McCarron completed his first career pass attempt for a three-yard completion in a 31–7 victory over the St. Louis Rams. In the next game, McCarron completed two out of three passes for 19 yards in a 37–3 road victory over the Browns.

On December 13, 2015, starting quarterback Andy Dalton fractured the thumb on his throwing hand while trying to make a tackle in the first quarter against the Pittsburgh Steelers. Although the Steelers won 33–20, McCarron came in and completed 22 of 32 passes for 280 yards, with two touchdowns and two interceptions. The following week, McCarron became the first Alabama quarterback to win an NFL game since Jeff Rutledge of the New York Giants in 1987, when the Bengals beat the San Francisco 49ers on the road by a score of 24–14. In his first career start, McCarron completed 15 of 21 passes for 192 yards and a touchdown. The following week against the Denver Broncos, he completed 22 of 35 passes for 200 yards and a touchdown in a 17–20 overtime road loss. In the AFC Wild Card Round, McCarron completed 23 of 41 passes for 212 yards, a touchdown, and an interception, but the Bengals narrowly lost to the Steelers by a score 18–16, ending their season.

2016 season
McCarron played in one game in 2016 and recorded no statistics in a Week 6 game against New England.

2017 season

On October 31, 2017, the Bengals and Cleveland Browns agreed on a deal to trade McCarron to Cleveland in exchange for a second and third-round pick in the 2018 NFL Draft. However, the Browns failed to file the paperwork to the NFL before the trade deadline, nixing the trade. On November 4, it was reported that McCarron had filed a labor grievance against the Bengals asking to become an unrestricted free agent following the 2017 season as opposed to a restricted free agent. McCarron claimed that he was healthy enough to be removed from the non-football injury list during training camp in 2014 and that his rookie season should count as an accrued season towards unrestricted free agency. On February 15, 2018, McCarron won the grievance and became a free agent for the 2018 season, and received lost salary with interest from the 2014 season. Overall, in the 2017 season, McCarron appeared in three games and completed seven of 14 passes for 66 yards.

Buffalo Bills

On March 14, 2018, McCarron signed a two-year, $10 million contract with the Buffalo Bills. He competed for the starting quarterback position with second-year quarterback Nathan Peterman and rookie Josh Allen. However, McCarron suffered a shoulder injury during a preseason game against the Cleveland Browns. The injury was initially reported as a hairline fracture in his collarbone, which would have sidelined him for about 4–6 weeks. Nonetheless, McCarron received a second opinion on the injury, which revealed no fracture, clearing him to participate in the next two preseason games, including a comeback win over the Chicago Bears where he passed for three touchdowns and ran for another in the fourth quarter despite carrying a 0.0 passer rating the previous three quarters.

Oakland Raiders
On September 1, 2018, McCarron was traded to the Oakland Raiders for a 2019 fifth-round draft pick (originally acquired from the Pittsburgh Steelers). He appeared in two games in relief of Derek Carr in the 2018 season, completing one of three passes for eight yards.

McCarron was released on March 14, 2019, shortly after the beginning of the new NFL season.

Houston Texans
On March 20, 2019, McCarron signed a one-year contract with the Houston Texans. In the regular-season finale against the Tennessee Titans, McCarron recorded his first start since the 2015 season since the Texans were already locked into the #4 seed in the AFC and sat most of their starters as a result. During the game, McCarron threw for 225 yards and an interception and rushed for 39 yards and a touchdown in the 35–14 loss.

On March 30, 2020, McCarron re-signed with the Texans. He briefly entered the Week 14 matchup against the Chicago Bears after starter Deshaun Watson hurt his elbow, but McCarron was sacked on his lone play for a turnover on downs. The Texans went on to lose on the road by a score of 36–7. During the regular-season finale against the Tennessee Titans, McCarron came into the game during the second quarter and threw a single pass for 20 yards in the 41–38 loss.

Atlanta Falcons
On April 30, 2021, McCarron signed a one-year contract with the Atlanta Falcons. He suffered a torn ACL in the Week 2 preseason game against the Miami Dolphins and was placed on season-ending injured reserve.

St. Louis BattleHawks

On November 15, 2022, McCarron was drafted by the St. Louis BattleHawks of the XFL. McCarron quickly became a breakout star for the Battlehawks after two consecutive comeback victories in the first two weeks of the 2023 season. In a postgame interview, McCarron stated he chose to play in the XFL rather than take a more lucrative position as an NFL backup in order to give himself more on-camera playing time so his children could watch him play, which prompted XFL co-owner Dwayne Johnson to praise McCarron for his choice.

NFL career statistics

Regular season

Postseason

Spring League career statistics

Regular season

Personal life
McCarron became engaged to model and longtime girlfriend Katherine Webb in March 2014. They were married on July 12, 2014, in Orange Beach, Alabama. Webb announced on December 8, 2015, that she was four months pregnant with their first son, to whom she gave birth in May 2016. In December 2018, Webb gave birth to a second son. In March 2021, she gave birth to the couple's third son. McCarron is a devout Roman Catholic.

See also
 List of NCAA major college football yearly passing leaders

References

External links

Collegiate statistics at Sports-Reference.com
 Alabama Crimson Tide bio
 Cincinnati Bengals bio

1990 births
Living people
Catholics from Alabama
Players of American football from Alabama
Sportspeople from Mobile, Alabama
American football quarterbacks
Alabama Crimson Tide football players
Cincinnati Bengals players
Buffalo Bills players
Oakland Raiders players
Houston Texans players
Atlanta Falcons players
St. Louis BattleHawks players